Raymond Ho Chung-tai  (born 23 March 1939 in Hong Kong with family roots in Shunde, Guangdong) was, from 1998 to 2012, a member of the Legislative Council of Hong Kong (Legco), representing the engineering industry in functional constituencies seats. During his tenure in the legislature, he was a  member of Professional Forum, formerly known as the Alliance a pro-Beijing group in Legco. In 2012, he lost the election to Lo Wai-Kok a member of BPA, a pro-Beijing group.

He is a registered structural engineer and a registered professional engineer in building, civil, environmental, geotechnical and structural engineering. He is the ex-president of Hong Kong Institution of Engineers.

Raymond graduated with a Bachelor of Science degree in engineering from the University of Hong Kong, and a Doctor of Philosophy degree from the City, University of London.

References

External links 
Raymond Ho

1939 births
Living people
Chinese structural engineers
Hong Kong civil engineers
Alumni of the University of Hong Kong
Alumni of the University of Manchester
Alumni of City, University of London
Delegates to the 10th National People's Congress from Hong Kong
Delegates to the 11th National People's Congress from Hong Kong
Members of the Order of the British Empire
Recipients of the Silver Bauhinia Star
New Hong Kong Alliance politicians
Business and Professionals Federation of Hong Kong politicians
Professional Forum politicians
Members of the Provisional Legislative Council
HK LegCo Members 1998–2000
HK LegCo Members 2000–2004
HK LegCo Members 2004–2008
HK LegCo Members 2008–2012
Hong Kong Basic Law Consultative Committee members
Members of the Selection Committee of Hong Kong
Members of the Election Committee of Hong Kong, 2017–2021